Bergstrom Air Force Base (1942–1993) was located seven miles southeast of Austin, Texas.  In its later years it was a major base for the United States Air Force (USAF) RF-4C Phantom reconnaissance fighter fleet.

History
Bergstrom was originally activated on 19 September 1942, as Del Valle Army Air Base. The United States Army leased  from the city of Austin, on land acquired from the Santiago Del Valle Grant. The Chisholm Trail ran through the tract. The name of the base was changed to Bergstrom Army Air Field on 3 March 1943, in honor of Austinite captain John August Earl Bergstrom, who was killed at Clark Field, Philippines during one of the early Japanese bombings at the start of World War II.  Bergstrom was a member of the 19th Bombardment Group. 

The base was renamed Bergstrom Field on 11 November 1943 at the suggestion of then-Congressman Lyndon B. Johnson. It became Bergstrom Air Force Base in December 1948, coinciding with the creation of the USAF as a separate service.  Initially, Bergstrom was the home of troop-carrier units, some of which participated in the Berlin Airlift. The base was transferred to Strategic Air Command (SAC) in 1949, followed by the arrival of the 27th Fighter Wing on March 1 of that year.  The 12th Fighter-Escort Wing arrived at the base in December 1950.  On July 1, 1957, the base was transferred from SAC to Tactical Air Command (TAC).  The 27th Fighter Wing received new F-101A and F-101C Voodoo fighter aircraft directly from the McDonnell factory.  Four squadrons flew the Voodoo under the 27th, the 481st, 522nd, 523rd, and 524th Fighter Squadrons.  The Voodoos had a short run at Bergstrom, being sent to the UK as a nuclear deterrent in 1958. 

On October 1, 1958, the base once again came under SAC control, and the 4130th Strategic Wing moved in.  Flying under the Second Air Force, the unit flew B-52 Stratofortress bombers and KC-135 Stratotanker aerial refueling aircraft. The 4130th was dissolved and its assets and personnel became the 340th Bombardment Wing, Heavy on Sept. 1, 1963.  On July 1, 1966 the base was once again transferred back to TAC, becoming home to the Twelfth Air Force and the 75th Tactical Reconnaissance Wing (TRW).  The 12th was the controlling organization responsible for all TAC reconnaissance, fighter, and airlift operations west of the Mississippi River.  On July 15, 1971, the 75 TRW was replaced by the 67 TRW.  The base became the primary tactical reconnaissance base in the entire USAF.  Four squadrons equipped with the RF-4C Phantom operated under the 67th, the 12th Tactical Reconnaissance Squadron (TRS), the 45th Tactical Reconnaissance Training Squadron (TRTS), the 62nd TRTS, and the 91st TRS.  Co-located was the Air Force Reserve's 924th Tactical Airlift Group as of October 8, 1976, flying C-130 Hercules transports.  The 924th changed missions and designations in September 1981, becoming the 924th Tactical Fighter Group flying the F-4D and then F-4E Phantom.  Bergstrom hosted the Reconnaissance Air Meet (RAM) in 1986, 1988, and 1990.  RAM was a competition between the USAF, Air National Guard, United States Navy, United States Marine Corps, and select foreign reconnaissance units.  A drawdown of USAF tactical reconnaissance, hastened by the end of the Cold War, saw the 45TRTS and 62TRTS disband, followed by the 91TRS.  The 12TRS deployed its RF-4Cs to the middle east in support of Operation Desert Shield/Desert Storm in 1991.  Shortly after their return from the desert, the 12th and its parent 67TRW were re-designated 12 Reconnaissance Squadron and 67 Reconnaissance Wing, respectively.  Shortly after, both organizations were disbanded.

In the 1960s, Bergstrom AFB became the place where Air Force One flew into and out of often. It was the airfield that Lyndon Johnson flew into and out of when president when traveling between Washington and his ranch in Texas.

During the 1970s, Austin's tiny municipal airport became crowded and noise complaints increased.  The city approached the USAF in 1978 to propose a shared civil-military airport at Bergstrom, but the original proposal and further ones in 1981 and 1984 were all rejected.  In 1979 the Concorde visited Bergstrom, followed by the Space Shuttles Columbia and Discovery on their Shuttle Carrier Aircraft in 1981 and 1985, respectively.

In 1990, Bergstrom ended up on a list of 75 military facilities under study for closure by the post-Cold War Base Realignment and Closure Committee.  On 30 September 1993, Bergstrom was officially closed and a bond was raised for Austin-Bergstrom International Airport.  Much of the former air base, including buildings, trees, and structures, was completely demolished, with a few exceptions, such as the circular Twelfth Air Force Headquarters building (which was converted into a hotel) and the original 12,250-foot runway.  Air cargo operations began in June 1997 and passenger operations started in May 1999.

See also

Central Air Defense Force (Air Defense Command)
Texas World War II Army Airfields
 I Troop Carrier Command

References

Handbook of Texas Online
 Bergstrom AFB Memorial in the concourse of Austin Bergstrom International Airport
 Donald, David (2004) Century Jets: USAF Frontline Fighters of the Cold War. AIRtime 
 Endicott, Judy G. (1999) Active Air Force wings as of 1 October 1995; USAF active flying, space, and missile squadrons as of 1 October 1995. Maxwell AFB, Alabama: Office of Air Force History. CD-ROM.
 Martin, Patrick (1994). Tail Code: The Complete History of USAF Tactical Aircraft Tail Code Markings. Schiffer Military Aviation History. .
 Maurer Maurer (1983), Air Force Combat Units of World War II, Office of Air Force History. 
 Menard, David W. (1993) USAF Plus Fifteen: A Photo History, 1947–1962.  Schiffer Publishing, Ltd. 
 Mueller, Robert (1989). Active Air Force Bases Within the United States of America on 17 September 1982 USAF Reference Series, Maxwell AFB, Alabama: Office of Air Force History. 
 Ravenstein, Charles A. (1984). Air Force Combat Wings Lineage and Honors Histories 1947–1977. Maxwell AFB, Alabama: Office of Air Force History. .
 Rogers, Brian (2005). United States Air Force Unit Designations Since 1978. Hinkley, England: Midland Publications. .
  Joe Baugher's Encyclopedia of American Aircraft
 USAAS-USAAC-USAAF-USAF Aircraft Serial Numbers—1908 to Present
 Strategic-Air-Command.com

External links

Installations of the United States Air Force in Texas
History of Austin, Texas
Military installations closed in 1993
Military in Austin, Texas
Installations of Strategic Air Command
1993 disestablishments in Texas
Austin–Bergstrom International Airport